Daniel "Dani" Filipe Faria Coelho (born 17 January 1990) is a Portuguese professional footballer who plays for Berço as a right back.

Club career
A youth product of S.C. Braga, Dani only managed to appear once for the first team in official matches, playing the full 90 minutes in a 2–1 away win against S.U. 1º de Dezembro for the third round in the Portuguese Cup, on 10 October 2010. He was also loaned to C.F. Estrela da Amadora, S.C. Covilhã and F.C. Vizela during his spell, the latter being the farm team.

In the summer of 2012, Dani signed for F.C. Arouca of the second division, starting in 26 of his 27 league appearances as the club promoted to the Primeira Liga for the first time in its history. One year later, he moved to fellow league side F.C. Penafiel on a free transfer.

Honours
CFR Cluj
Cupa României: 2015–16

References

External links

1990 births
Living people
People from Barcelos, Portugal
Portuguese footballers
Association football defenders
Primeira Liga players
Liga Portugal 2 players
Segunda Divisão players
S.C. Braga players
C.F. Estrela da Amadora players
F.C. Vizela players
S.C. Covilhã players
F.C. Arouca players
F.C. Penafiel players
C.D. Santa Clara players
Lusitânia F.C. players
GS Loures players
Berço SC players
Liga I players
CFR Cluj players
Portugal youth international footballers
Portugal under-21 international footballers
Portuguese expatriate footballers
Expatriate footballers in Romania
Portuguese expatriate sportspeople in Romania
Sportspeople from Braga District